Manius Aemilius Lepidus was a Roman senator, who was active during the Principate. He was ordinary consul in AD 11 as the colleague of Titus Statilius Taurus. Tacitus reports that Augustus on his deathbed, while discussing possible rivals for the Roman Emperor Tiberius, described him as worthy of becoming emperor (capax imperii), but "disdainful" of supreme power.

Biography

Early life
Lepidus has been assumed to be the son of Marcus Aemilius Lepidus the Younger and his wife Servilia Isaurica, but it is in modern-day believed that he was more likely the nephew of Lepidus the Younger. He had a sister named Aemilia Lepida.

Career
After 5 BC, but prior to acceding to the consulship, Lepidus was coopted as an Augur. He defended his sister at her trial in AD 20. At the trial of Clutorius Priscus, he argued without success that the proposed death sentence was excessively harsh. In AD 21, he achieved the pinacle of a Senatorial career, the proconsular governorship of Asia.

Personal life
He had a daughter also called Aemilia Lepida who married Emperor Galba.

Family

References

Imperial Roman consuls
Roman governors of Asia
Augurs of the Roman Empire
Aemilii Lepidi
1st-century BC Romans
1st-century Romans